Sibel Adalı is a Turkish-American computer scientist who studies trust in social networks and uncertainty in decision-making. She is a professor of computer science at Rensselaer Polytechnic Institute, and associate dean for research at Rensselaer.

Education and career
Adalı graduated in 1991 from Bilkent University, with a bachelor's degree in computer engineering and information science. She went to the University of Maryland, College Park for her graduate studies in computer science, earning a master's degree in 1994 and completing her Ph.D. in 1996. Her dissertation, Query Processing in Heterogeneous Mediated Systems, was supervised by V. S. Subrahmanian.

She became a faculty member at Rensselaer Polytechnic Institute in 1996.

Book
Adalı wrote the book Modeling Trust Context in Networks (Springer, 2013).

Personal
Adalı maintains a web site of Turkish poetry, with translations into many other languages.

She is the sister of electrical engineer Tülay Adalı.

References

External links
Home page

Year of birth missing (living people)
Living people
American people of Turkish descent
American computer scientists
Turkish computer scientists
American women computer scientists
Bilkent University alumni
University of Maryland, College Park alumni
Rensselaer Polytechnic Institute faculty
American women academics
21st-century American women